Tracker is the eighth solo studio album by the British singer-songwriter and guitarist Mark Knopfler, released on 16 March 2015 (17 March 2015 in North America).

Release
Tracker was released on CD, double vinyl, deluxe CD with four bonus tracks, and a box set with the album on both CD and vinyl formats and a bonus CD with six extra tracks and a DVD with a short film directed by Henrik Hansen and an interview with Knopfler.

Touring
Knopfler promoted the album on his Tracker Tour, which started on 15 May 2015 in Dublin, Ireland. The tour included 86 concerts in two legs — Europe and North America — and ended on 31 October 2015 in Fort Lauderdale, Florida, in the United States.

Critical response

According to the review aggregator website Metacritic, Tracker received generally favorable reviews, achieving a critical score of 70 based on 15 critic reviews. In his review for AllMusic, Stephen Thomas Erlewine gave the album three and a half out of five stars, noting that the album is "scaled smaller" than his previous double-album effort Privateering, "easing its way into being instead of announcing itself with a thunder". Erlewine writes: 
 
Erlewine concludes that the "skillful interweaving of Knopfler's personal past helps give Tracker a nicely gentle resonance".

In his review for American Songwriter, Hal Horowitz gave the album four out of five stars, observing:

Horowitz concludes that the album's "softly dignified pace, immaculately constructed lyrics and especially the immediately identifiable slithering guitar lines" all work to create "timeless songs that feel organic, measured and are clearly heartfelt as Knopfler crafts music that will sound as magnificent in 50 years as it does today."

Ken Capobianco, in his review for the Boston Globe, gave the album a positive review, writing, "Mark Knopfler continues his late-career resurgence with this skillfully crafted eighth solo effort, revealing a portrait gallery of quotidian and accomplished lives marked by yearning and reflection." Capobianco praised Knopfler's overall effort "delivering finely wrought, elegantly arranged songs of subtle depth and rich musicality". In his review for Rolling Stone, Will Hermes gave the album three and a half out of five stars, calling it "modest" and "multifaceted". Hermes noted, "Knopfler's quicksilver guitar is understated, and he delivers stories of stoic ache like an old watchmaker on a pub stool—quietly riveting."

In his review for The Telegraph, Neil McCormick gave the album three out of five stars, acknowledging the work's "understated refinement", but noting it "lacks the epic scope of Dire Straits". According to McCormick, there is a predictability to the album that undermines its effectiveness, noting, "Fans will find much to enjoy here, but it might be time for Knopfler to push himself out of his comfort zone." Ally Carnwath, in her review for The Guardian, also gave the album three out of five stars, observing a "predictable whiff of whiskey and rolling tobacco" about the effort. While Carnwarth notes Knopfler's inconsistency as a storyteller, she believes his music "remains a reliable source of warm bluesy guitarwork". In his review for Popmatters, John Garrett gave the album six out of ten stars, concluding, "It’s hard to nail down a specific identity for Tracker. The quality of each song is consistently good, but the album doesn't feel very cohesive when you step back to consider the whole package."

Track listing
All songs were written by Mark Knopfler except where indicated.
Disc one, standard

Disc two, bonus tracks

Personnel
 Mark Knopfler – vocals, guitar
 Guy Fletcher – keyboards, vocals
 Bruce Molsky – fiddle, rhythm guitar, banjo
 John McCusker – fiddle, cittern
 Michael McGoldrick – whistle, wooden flute
 Phil Cunningham – accordion
 Richard Bennett – guitars
 Glenn Worf – bass guitar
 Ian Thomas – drums
 Nigel Hitchcock – saxophone
 Tom Walsh – trumpet
 Ruth Moody – vocals

Production
 Mark Knopfler – producer
 Guy Fletcher – producer
 Richard Ford – sleeve notes

Charts and certifications

Weekly charts

Year-end charts

Certifications

References

External links
 Tracker at Mark Knopfler official website

2015 albums
Albums produced by Mark Knopfler
Mark Knopfler albums
Mercury Records albums